Jalan Medoi, Federal Route 1384 (formerly Johor state route J152), is a federal road in Segamat, Johor, Malaysia.

At most sections, the Federal Route 1384 was built under the JKR R5 road standard, with a speed limit of 90 km/h.

List of junctions and towns 

Malaysian Federal Roads
Segamat District